This page is an overview of the Australia at the UCI Track Cycling World Championships.

List of medalists 

This a list of Australian medals won at the UCI Track World Championships. This list now includes the amateur and defunct disciplines.

Sources

Medal table

Medals by discipline
updated after the 2022 UCI Track Cycling World Championships

2015 results
Australia competed at the 2015 UCI Track Cycling World Championships in Saint-Quentin-en-Yvelines at the Vélodrome de Saint-Quentin-en-Yvelines from 18–22 February 2015. A team of 20 cyclists (8 women, 12 men) was announced to represent the country in the event.

Men

Sources

Women

Sources

2016 results
Australia competed at the 2016 UCI Track Cycling World Championships at the Lee Valley VeloPark in London, United Kingdom from 2-4 March 2016. A team of 20 cyclists (8 women, 12 men) was announced to represent the country in the event.

Men

Sources

Women

Sources

See also
Australia at the 2008 UCI Track Cycling World Championships
 Cuba at the UCI Track Cycling World Championships
 Netherlands at the UCI Track Cycling World Championships

References

Nations at the UCI Track Cycling World Championships
Australia at cycling events